Dolenje may refer to:

Dolegna del Collio, or Dolenje in Slovene, a commune of Italy
Dolenje, Ajdovščina, a settlement in the Municipality of Ajdovščina, Slovenia
Dolenje, Domžale, a settlement in the Municipality of Domžale, Slovenia
Dolenje, Sežana, a settlement in the Municipality of Sežana, Slovenia
Dolenje pri Jelšanah, a settlement in Municipality of Ilirska Bistrica, Slovenia